The 9th season of Taniec z Gwiazdami, the Polish edition of Dancing With the Stars, started on 6 September 2009 and ended on 29 November 2009. It was broadcast by TVN. Katarzyna Skrzynecka and Piotr Gąsowski continued as the hosts, and the judges were: Iwona Szymańska-Pavlović, Zbigniew Wodecki, Beata Tyszkiewicz and Piotr Galiński.

Couples

Scores

Red numbers indicate the lowest score for each week.
Green numbers indicate the highest score for each week.
 indicates the couple eliminated that week.
 indicates the returning couple that finished in the bottom two.
 indicates the winning couple of the week.
 indicates the runner-up of the week.
 indicates the third place couple of the week.
 indicates the couple withdrew from the competition.
Notes:

Week 1: Bartek Kasprzykowski scored 35 out of 40 on his first dance (Waltz), making it the highest Week 1 score in this episode. Francys Barraza Sudnicka and Marcin Chochlew got 20 points for their Cha-cha-cha, making it the lowest score of the week. Because of Weronika's dance was scheduled the first one but the actress announced her withdrawal from the show, even though she decided to dance her first Cha-cha-cha. Weronika's withdrawal, there was no elimination this week.

Week 2: Dorota Gardias-Skóra scored 38 out of 40 for her Rumba, making it the highest Week 2 score in history of the show, thereby equalizing the record obtained by Marta Żmuda-Trzebiatowska in Season 8. Francys Barraza Sudnicka got 20 points for her Quickstep, making it the lowest score of the week and this season. Tomasz & Katarzyna were eliminated despite being 11 points from the bottom.

Week 3: Dorota Gardias-Skóra received the first perfect score of the season as well as the earliest perfect score in history of the show, thereby equalizing the record obtained by Mateusz Damięcki (Season 6), Agata Kulesza and Alan Andersz (both Season 8). Francys Barraza Sudnicka got 21 points for her Jive, making it the lowest score of the week, which led them to be on the bottom of the leaderboard for the third consecutive week. Dorota & Marcin were eliminated despite being 7 points from the bottom.

Week 4: Bartek Kasprzykowski received his first perfect score for the Paso Doble and Dorota Gardias-Skóra received her second perfect score for the Paso Doble. Paweł Nastula got 20 points for his Paso Doble, making it the lowest score of the week. Marcin & Janja were eliminated despite being 13 points from the bottom.

Week 5: Monika Richardson received her first perfect score for the Viennese Waltz and Jay Delano received his first perfect score for the Samba, which was the first perfect score for samba in history of the show. Francys Barraza Sudnicka got 23 points for her Viennese Waltz, making it the lowest score of the week. Francys & Łukasz were eliminated.

Week 6: All couples danced to songs from famous comedy movies. Bartek Kasprzykowski received his second perfect score for the Quickstep and Dorota Gardias-Skóra received her third perfect score for the Foxtrot. Paweł Nastula got 24 points for his Jive, making it the lowest score of the week. Wojciech & Izabela were eliminated despite being 10 points from the bottom.

Week 7: All couples danced to Spanish songs. Dorota Gardias-Skóra scored 38 out of 40 on her dance (Cha-cha-cha), making it the highest Week 7 score in this episode. Paweł Nastula got 20 points for his Cha-cha-cha, making it the lowest score of the week. Paweł & Magdalena were eliminated.

Week 8: All couples danced to Polish songs. Bartek Kasprzykowski received his third perfect score for the Foxtrot. Anna Nowak-Ibisz got 28 points for her Samba, making it the lowest score of the week. Anna & Cezary were eliminated.

Week 9: Bartek Kasprzykowski received his 4th perfect score for the Viennese Waltz and Dorota Gardias-Skóra received her 4th perfect score for the Quickstep. Jay Delano got 3 points for his Paso Doble and Quickstep, making it the lowest score of the week. Monika & Krzysztof were eliminated despite being 6 points from the bottom.

Week 10: Dorota Gardias-Skóra scored 39 out of 40 on her dance (Viennese Waltz), making it the highest Week 10 score in this episode. Jay & Kamila were eliminated.

Week 11: Both Dorota Gardias-Skóra and Bartek Kasprzykowski got 120 out of 120 points, making it the first-season finale in a row with both couples getting the highest possible score. Both couples had to perform three dances: their favorite Latin dance, their favorite Ballroom dance and a Freestyle. Dorota Gardias-Skóra won the competition, having cast 60.28 percent of the votes. This is the 6th time the winner was on the first place according to the judges' scoreboard.

Special Star

Average chart

Average Dance chart

Highest and lowest scoring performances

The best and worst performances in each dance according to the judges' marks are as follows:

The Best Score (40)

Episodes

Week 1
Individual judges scores in charts below (given in parentheses) are listed in this order from left to right: Iwona Szymańska-Pavlović, Zbigniew Wodecki, Beata Tyszkiewicz and Piotr Galiński.

Running order

Week 2
Individual judges scores in charts below (given in parentheses) are listed in this order from left to right: Iwona Szymańska-Pavlović, Zbigniew Wodecki, Beata Tyszkiewicz and Piotr Galiński.

Running order

Week 3
Individual judges scores in charts below (given in parentheses) are listed in this order from left to right: Iwona Szymańska-Pavlović, Zbigniew Wodecki, Beata Tyszkiewicz and Piotr Galiński.

Running order

Week 4
Individual judges scores in charts below (given in parentheses) are listed in this order from left to right: Iwona Szymańska-Pavlović, Zbigniew Wodecki, Beata Tyszkiewicz and Piotr Galiński.

Running order

Week 5
Individual judges scores in charts below (given in parentheses) are listed in this order from left to right: Piotr Galiński, Zbigniew Wodecki, Beata Tyszkiewicz, Iwona Pavlović.

Running order

Week 6: Movie Themes Week
Individual judges scores in charts below (given in parentheses) are listed in this order from left to right: Iwona Szymańska-Pavlović, Zbigniew Wodecki, Beata Tyszkiewicz and Piotr Galiński.

Running order

Week 7: Spanish Week
Individual judges scores in charts below (given in parentheses) are listed in this order from left to right: Iwona Szymańska-Pavlović, Zbigniew Wodecki, Beata Tyszkiewicz and Piotr Galiński.

Running order

Week 8: Polish Week
Individual judges scores in charts below (given in parentheses) are listed in this order from left to right: Iwona Szymańska-Pavlović, Zbigniew Wodecki, Beata Tyszkiewicz and Piotr Galiński.

Running order

Week 9
Individual judges scores in charts below (given in parentheses) are listed in this order from left to right: Iwona Szymańska-Pavlović, Zbigniew Wodecki, Beata Tyszkiewicz and Piotr Galiński.

Running order

Week 10
Individual judges scores in charts below (given in parentheses) are listed in this order from left to right: Iwona Szymańska-Pavlović, Zbigniew Wodecki, Beata Tyszkiewicz and Piotr Galiński.

Running order

Week 11: Final
Individual judges scores in charts below (given in parentheses) are listed in this order from left to right: Iwona Szymańska-Pavlović, Zbigniew Wodecki, Beata Tyszkiewicz and Piotr Galiński.

Running order

Other Dances

Dance schedule
The celebrities and professional partners danced one of these routines for each corresponding week.
 Week 1: Cha-Cha-Cha or Waltz
 Week 2: Rumba or Quickstep
 Week 3: Jive or Tango
 Week 4: Paso Doble or Foxtrot
 Week 5: Samba or Viennese Waltz
 Week 6: One unlearned dance & Group Swing (Comedy Week)
 Week 7: One unlearned dance & Group Salsa (Spanish Week)
 Week 8: One unlearned dance & Group Viennese Waltz (Polish Week)
 Week 9: One unlearned & one repeated dance
 Week 10: One unlearned & one repeated dance
 Week 11: Favorite Latin dance, favorite Ballroom dance & Freestyle

Dance chart

 Highest scoring dance
 Lowest scoring dance
 Performed, but not scored

Weekly results
The order is based on the judges' scores combined with the viewers' votes.

 This couple came in first place with the judges.
 This couple came in first place with the judges and gained the highest number of viewers' votes.
 This couple gained the highest number of viewers' votes.
 This couple came in last place with the judges.
 This couple came in last place with the judges and was eliminated.
 This couple was eliminated.
 This couple withdrew from the competition.
 This couple won the competition.
 This couple came in second in the competition.
 This couple came in third in the competition.

Audience voting results
The percentage of votes cast by a couple in a particular week is given in parentheses.

Rating Figures

External links
  Official Site – Taniec z gwiazdami
  Taniec z gwiazdami on Polish Wikipedia

References

Season 09
2009 Polish television seasons